Alfred Deakin High School is a government secondary school in Deakin, Australian Capital Territory, covering years 7 to 10 in the Territory's education system. It is named after the second Australian Prime Minister, Alfred Deakin.

History 
Two separate schools in the area, Deakin High School in Deakin and Woden Valley High School in Mawson, commenced in 1966 and 1968 respectively. In 1989, the two were amalgamated on the Deakin site and the name Alfred Deakin High School chosen.

Since 1989 the school building has undergone considerable refurbishment, including the acquisition of modern kitchens and technology, including information technology and photography areas. During 1991 the school gymnasium was completed and officially opened. In more recent times special purpose rooms for dance and drama, computing, multi-media and problem solving in mathematics have been added. In early 1999 major refurbishments were completed in the science area and similar improvements to teaching spaces in Technology were completed in 2000. During 2009 the school under took refurbishment which included new toilets, new carpeting and an update to the gym. The upgrades were part of the Rudd government's Education revolution. The school is a "bring your own device" school and was one of the public schools in the ACT to embrace Google Apps for Education.

Weekend education
The Canberra Japanese Supplementary School Inc., a Japanese weekend educational programme, holds its classes at Deakin High School, while the school offices are in Yarralumla. It was established on 1 August 1988.

The ACT German Language School also holds classes at Deakin High School on weekend mornings.

Notable alumni
Sue Geh, women's basketball player
Jason Geria, soccer player
Liv Hewson, actor
John Stead, Anglican bishop

See also
 List of schools in the Australian Capital Territory

References

External links
 Alfred Deakin High School website

High schools in the Australian Capital Territory
Educational institutions established in 1989
1989 establishments in Australia